Afganit (Russian: Афганит, lit. 'Afghanite') is a Russian active protection system (APS) employed on modern Russian Armata family of vehicles. It is intended to supersede the Arena APS and utilises radar and electro-optical sensors in the ultraviolet and infrared bands. The millimeter-wavelength radar detects and tracks incoming anti-tank munitions. The system can reportedly intercept armour-piercing fin-stabilized discarding sabot kinetic energy penetrators in addition to high-explosive anti-tank (HEAT) munitions. According to news sources, it protects the tank from all sides.

References

Armoured fighting vehicle equipment
Weapons countermeasures